Lucretia Jans, or Lucretia van der Mijlen (1602 in Amsterdam – fl. 1641), was a survivor of the events that followed the sinking of the  in 1629.

She was the daughter of merchant Jan (or Hans) Meynertsz and Steffanie Joosten. She was married in 1620 to Boudewijn van der Mijlen (1629), diamond cutter, and in 1630, after her first husband's death, to Sergeant Jacob Cornelisz Cuick.

In October 1628, Jans departed the Netherlands on the Batavia to join her husband in Batavia, capital of the Dutch East India Company. On 4 June 1629, the ship foundered upon the reefs of the Houtman Abrolhos Islands off the western coast of Australia. Francisco Pelsaert, the ship's commander, and its skipper left with a team for Java (Jakarta) to seek help. Meanwhile, Jeronimus Cornelisz, the most senior Dutch East India Company official left behind, started terrorizing the other survivors with the intent of creating a pirate ship. Some were murdered and some of the women were used as sex slaves, with Cornelisz reserving Jans for himself.

When the rescue team arrived from Batavia, Cornelisz was executed at the scene of the crime, and the rest were put on trial in Batavia. During the trial, it was alleged that Jans was guilty of "provocation, encouraging evil acts and murdering the survivors … some of whom lost their lives owing to her backhandedness." Jans was put on trial and denied the charges. The court applied for permission to torture her, but it is unknown whether such permission was granted; she seems to have been acquitted of the charges. She returned to the Netherlands in 1635.

In 1647, the mutiny was described in the publication  ("Unlucky voyage of the ship Batavia"), based on the trial. This led to a law change—that made reference to the case—which limited female passengers on ships, on the grounds that their presence led to disturbances.

The opera Batavia, commissioned by Opera Australia, is based on the historical events surrounding the ship.

References

1602 births
17th-century Dutch women
17th-century Dutch East Indies people
People from Amsterdam
Shipwreck survivors
Kidnapped Dutch people
People acquitted of murder
Sexual slavery
Year of death unknown